The Police Special Intervention Unit (SIU) is a national police tactical unit in the Helsinki Police Department of the Police of Finland. It is commonly known as the Bear Squad''.

Function 
The Police Special Intervention Unit was formed as a national police tactical unit in the spring of 1972. It provided security for the Conference on Security and Co-operation in Europe, held in Helsinki in 1975. According to Finnish law, all counter-terrorist operations are within the jurisdiction of the Police. In addition to operative units, the group includes sniper, technical support, police dog, and bomb disposal teams. It can be reinforced with a negotiation team during hostage situations. The Karhu Unit operates under the authority of the Helsinki Police Department and, in turn, the National Police Board and the Ministry of the Interior. Team members are selected from currently serving law enforcement personnel and undergo a training of one year, followed by a continuous on-the-job training programme. They alternate between normal field work, training and special operations duties: Training takes approximately half and special operations  of their time while the rest consists of regular duties. The team had a strength of around 60 officers and 4 police dogs in 2011.

See also

 GIGN
 Kauhajoki school shooting
 Law enforcement in Finland
 National Task Force
 2017 Turku stabbing
 Utti Jaeger Regiment

References 

Law enforcement agencies of Finland
Non-military counterterrorist organizations
ATLAS Network